Galyanna may refer to: 

-Gulyana, a town in Punjab, Pakistan

-The capitol of the 2002 shooter game Turok: Evolution